Matti Salomo Pulkkinen (15 November 1873 - 2 December 1952) was a Finnish farmer and politician, born in Ristijärvi. He was a member of the Parliament of Finland from 1911 to 1916, representing the Agrarian League.

References

1873 births
1952 deaths
People from Ristijärvi
People from Oulu Province (Grand Duchy of Finland)
Finnish Lutherans
Centre Party (Finland) politicians
Members of the Parliament of Finland (1911–13)
Members of the Parliament of Finland (1913–16)